Feohanagh-Castlemahon is a Gaelic Athletic Association club located in the parish of Mahoonagh, County Limerick, Ireland. It was founded in 1890.  Coolyroe is the main centre for the GAA field, known as Quaid Park.

Hurling is the main sport in Feohanagh-Castlemahon (Fheothanach – Caisleán Uí Mhathúna).  For hurling, Mahoonagh parish is represented by Feohanagh and Gaelic football is represented by Castlemahon. 

There are also handball courts in Coolyroe.

Feohanagh/Castlemahon won the 2011 West Junior A Hurling Championship defeating Dromcollogher/Broadford in the final in Feenagh on 15 October 2011 on a scoreline of 2–10 to 0–08. In 2013, they retained their West Junior A hurling title with a win over neighbours Feenagh/Kilmeedy. However, when the two sides met again in the county final, Feenagh won by 0–14 to 0–11. In 2014 Feohanagh/Castlemahon won the County Junior Championship hurling final beating Na Piarsaigh in a replay on a scoreline of 0-20 to 0-09.

In football in 2013 they were beaten by Glin 0-08 to 0–07 in the West final, but like the hurling that year, the West runners-up won the county final as Castlemahon won on a score line of 1–08 to 1–07, securing intermediate status for 2014. They went on to defeat Drom-Inch of Tipperary and Coolmeen of Clare but were beaten in the Munster Junior Football Championship Final by Keel of Kerry by 0–14 to 0–04.

Joint teams 
From time to time the club joins with  Knockaderry  to put forward a team known as Deel Rangers and with  Killeedy  as Bunoke Gaels.

Notable players
Notable hurlers from the club include;
Tommy Quaid
John Flanagan
Joe Quaid
Jack Quaid
Jim Quaid
Séamus Quaid
Séamus Flanagan

Both Tommy Quaid and his cousin Joe played in goal for Limerick in hurling from the mid-1970s to the end of the 1990s. John Flanagan played for Limerick for several years in the late 70s and early 80s. Tommy's and Joe's father were twin brothers and won Junior All Ireland medals with Limerick in 1954. They won Munster Senior medals in 1955. Seamus was a first cousin of Jack and Jim and played with both Limerick and Wexford, winning an All Ireland Senior medal with the latter.

Notable footballers include;
 Footballer Con Murphy played for the club - and both Limerick and Munster. He played Railway cup for Munster in 1936. 
 His grandson Conor Murphy played for Limerick footballers in the 1990s.
 Moses O'Donnell also played with Limerick footballers in the late 20s &early 30s

Gaelic games clubs in County Limerick
Hurling clubs in County Limerick
Gaelic football clubs in County Limerick